Secretary Ross may refer to:

 Wilbur Ross (born 1937), United States Secretary of Commerce (2017–present)
 Willie Ross, Baron Ross of Marnock (1911–1988), Secretary of State for Scotland (1964–1970, 1974–1976)

See also 
 Ross (name)